Rhodri Mabon ap Gwynfor is a Welsh Plaid Cymru politician who has been Member of the Senedd (MS) for Dwyfor Meirionnydd since 2021.

Career
Ap Gwynfor was elected as a town councillor in Aberystwyth Town Council in 2004. He was later elected as a Denbighshire county Councillor for Llandrillo in 2017, before resigning in August 2021. In his resignation letter, he said it was impossible to "effectively" fulfil roles as a councillor and Senedd Member.

He previously stood for Parliament and the Senedd several times: Brecon and Radnor (2005), Clwyd South (2011, 2015 and 2016). He unsuccessfully fought the nomination for Ceredigion ahead of the 2010 General election and Dwyfor Meirionnydd in 2015.

Personal life
He is the grandson of Plaid Cymru's first Member of Parliament and former president, Gwynfor Evans.

References

Year of birth missing (living people)
Living people
Plaid Cymru members of the Senedd
Wales MSs 2021–2026
Plaid Cymru councillors
Welsh-speaking politicians